Kunashak is a rural locality (a selo) and the administrative center of Kunashaksky District, Chelyabinsk Oblast, Russia. Population:

References

Notes

Sources

Rural localities in Chelyabinsk Oblast